Młynek may refer to the following places:
Młynek, Kuyavian-Pomeranian Voivodeship (north-central Poland)
Młynek, Opoczno County in Łódź Voivodeship (central Poland)
Młynek, Radomsko County in Łódź Voivodeship (central Poland)
Młynek, Tomaszów Mazowiecki County in Łódź Voivodeship (central Poland)
Młynek, Pińczów County in Świętokrzyskie Voivodeship (south-central Poland)
Młynek, Starachowice County in Świętokrzyskie Voivodeship (south-central Poland)
Młynek, Koło County in Greater Poland Voivodeship (west-central Poland)
Młynek, Konin County in Greater Poland Voivodeship (west-central Poland)
Młynek, Silesian Voivodeship (south Poland)
Młynek, Opole Voivodeship (south-west Poland)
Młynek, Chojnice County in Pomeranian Voivodeship (north Poland)
Młynek, Kartuzy County in Pomeranian Voivodeship (north Poland)

See also
Młynek (game) (strategy game)